is a Japanese handball player for Hokkoku Bank and the Japanese national team.

She competed at the 2015 World Women's Handball Championship in Denmark.

References

External links

1991 births
Living people
Japanese female handball players
Asian Games medalists in handball
Handball players at the 2014 Asian Games
Asian Games silver medalists for Japan
Medalists at the 2014 Asian Games
Expatriate handball players
Japanese expatriate sportspeople in Denmark
Sportspeople from Okayama
Handball players at the 2020 Summer Olympics
21st-century Japanese women
20th-century Japanese women